Tripterocalyx micranthus is a species of flowering plant in the four o'clock family known by the common names smallflower sandverbena and small-flowered sand-verbena.

It is native to North America, where it is known from southern Alberta and Saskatchewan through a section of the central United States toward the desert southwest in California, Arizona, and New Mexico. It can be found in several types of habitat, including sandy and scrubby desert regions and sagebrush.

Description
Tripterocalyx micranthus  is erect and branched but generally compact, its hairy, glandular stem reaching a maximum length near 60 centimeters. The stem is red in color and sticky in texture.

Each leaf has a fleshy, hairy green blade up to 6 centimeters long which is borne on a long petiole.

The inflorescence is a head of several elongated flowers borne on long, glandular pedicels all attached at the small central receptacle. Each trumpet-shaped pink or green-tinged flower may be up to 1.8 centimeters in length and up to half a centimeter wide at the face of the corolla, with 4 or 5 lobes.

The fruit has wide, thin, net-veined or ribbed wings extending from a central body. It is an annual herb and its native habitats include prairies, meadows, and fields.

References

External links
Jepson Manual Treatment
Flora of North America
Photo gallery

Nyctaginaceae
Natural history of the Mojave Desert
Flora of Western Canada
Flora of the Northwestern United States
Flora of the North-Central United States
Flora of the Southwestern United States
Flora of the South-Central United States
Flora without expected TNC conservation status